Corçà is a locality located in the municipality of Àger, in Province of Lleida province, Catalonia, Spain. As of 2020, it has a population of 24.

Geography 
Corçà is located 70km north of Lleida.

References

Populated places in the Province of Lleida